Jill Justin-Coffel (born October 1967) is an American, former collegiate NCAA Division I All-American, right-handed hitting softball player, originally from Oak Lawn, Illinois. She played for the Northern Illinois Huskies softball team as an outfielder from 1986–89, partly in the Mid-American Conference and defunct North Star Conference. She and later was a medal-winning member of Team USA softball. She is the 4-year batting average champion (5th overall) for the NCAA and owns nearly all Huskie batting records.

Northern Illinois Huskies
Justin-Coffel graduated from Harold L. Richards High School in 1986 with a Hall-of-Fame career. In her 1986 freshman season, she earned All-MAC conference honors and set new school season records for batting average, home runs and slugging percentage, all of which rank in the top-5 at the school. On April 4, 1986, Justin-Coffel hit a school single-game record of three doubles vs. the Ball State Cardinals.

During her sophomore year, Justin-Coffel earned First Team All-American recognition. The Huskie broke her own average and slugging records whilst also posting new records in hits, doubles and on-base percentage. Justin-Coffel still heads the lists in single season slugging, while her hits and triples are tied for second place all-time in the program. Her school record batting average and doubles (career bests) also led the NCAA.

Justin-Coffel also achieved a then university record 15 consecutive game hitting streak. On May 1, 1987, she became the first player in NCAA Division I to hit three home runs and amass a total of 13 bases for a single game (against the Bradley Braves), in which the Huskies eventually won 12-2. Both record totals from the game were tops for the Division.

In 1988, Justin-Coffel was once again honored as a First Team All-American. She was also selected for the All-North Star conference accolade after the program spent the previous year as an Independent. For the second consecutive time, she was crowned batting champ in the NCAA. Justin-Coffel's home run and on-base percentage were new school records, she still retains the on-base title; her hits were second only to her previous year's mark and remains top-5 all-time. Along with her RBI total, she earned a conference batting Triple Crown.

The Huskies entered their first Women's College World Series and it also would be Justin-Coffel's only appearance. The team was eliminated by the eventual champions the UCLA Bruins on May 27; she had a double and two walks in two games. For that World Series, Justin-Coffel was awarded the NSC Offensive MVP title.

For her final season with the Huskies, Justin-Coffel was awarded with all-season honors as a 1989 First Team All-American and received her second All-North Star selection. Achieving a .443 average, it was the first occasion a Division I player had hit .400 or better in all four eligible seasons of play. For the Huskies, Justin-Coffel held all the top seasons averages and she also surpassed Yvette Cannon (George Mason Patriots) for the batting crown in all Division I capacities where at least two seasons of 250 at-bats were played. Her career best RBI total was also a new school record, while her on-base and triples were and still do rank top-5, and she led the NCAA in slugging percentage with another career best. These would help her to a second conference batting Triple Crown.

Justin-Coffel claims career records in average, RBIs, hits, home runs, triples, doubles, slugging and on base percentages; she is second in runs for the Huskies. In the NCAA, she posted the best slugging percentage and still ranks in the top-20 for a career.

Post-NIU
Justin-Coffel was invited to join Team USA and proceeded to win gold at the World and Pan-American championships between 1990 and 1995. She also auditioned for the 1996 Atlanta Olympics.

The former Huskie also played during the summer season for the Connecticut Brakettes from 1999-2004 and set all-time team records for RBIs, home runs and doubles. On August 24, 2001, Justin-Coffel "singled to drive" in the winning run for the National A.S.A. Championship, in which the Brakettes won 2-1.

In 1994, Justin-Coffel was inducted into the NIU Athletics Hall of Fame and, in 2002, was inducted a second time alongside her 1988 teammates. Justin-Coffel was also inducted into the Harold L. Richards High School's Hall of Fame on September 24, 2006.

As of 2006, Justin-Coffel worked as a physical education (PE) instructor in Illinois state.

Statistics

Northern Illinois Huskies softball

References

Links
NCAA Division I softball career .400 batting average list

External links
 

1967 births
Living people
Northern Illinois University alumni
People from Oak Lawn, Illinois
Softball players from Illinois